Craven/Maddalena Films is a film production company founded in 1996 by Wes Craven and Marianne Maddalena. It was best known for producing horror films, many of which are Craven's films and his remakes.

Films by release 
 Scream 2 (1997)
 Don't Look Down (TV movie) (1998)
 Music of the Heart (1999)
 Scream 3 (2000)
 Cursed (2005)
 Red Eye (2005)
 The Hills Have Eyes (2006)
 The Waiting (2007)
 Home (2007)
 The Last House on the Left (2009)

References 

Mass media companies established in 1996
Film production companies of the United States
Companies based in Los Angeles County, California